Nando Bruno (6 October 1895 – 10 April 1963) was an Italian film actor. He appeared in 84 films between 1938 and 1961. He was born in Rome, Italy and he died there.

Selected filmography

 A Lady Did It (1938) - Un collego di Pasquale
 Le sorprese del divorzio (1939) - L'artificiere
 Montevergine (1939) - Francesco
 Dora Nelson (1939) - Gegè
 Mare (1940) - Il pescatore
 Incanto di mezzanotte (1940)
 L'imprevisto (1940)
 Two Hearts Among the Beasts (1943) - Il "piccolo gigante"
 Silenzio, si gira! (1943) - Un gioccatore di dadi sul set
 Gli assi della risata (1943) - Tentotti (segment "Il trionfo di Poppea") (uncredited)
 The Last Wagon (1943) - Augusto Pallotta, il vetturino
 Life Begins Anew (1945) - Scorcelletti, il camionista
 Rome, Open City (1945) - Agostino the Sexton
 Departure at Seven (1946)
 Mio figlio professore (My Son, the Professor) (1946) - Angeloni
 Roma città libera (1946) - Il ladro
 To Live in Peace (1947) - Il Segretario Politico
 Flesh Will Surrender (1947)  - Antonio
 L'onorevole Angelina (1947) - Pasquale Bianchi
 Christmas at Camp 119 (1947) - La guida di Roma
 Lost Youth (1948) - Il commissario
 How I Lost the War (1948) - Checco Tremelloni
 Bicycle Thieves (1948) - (uncredited)
 Immigrants (1948) - Gigi
 The Flame That Will Not Die (1949)
 La sposa non può attendere (1949) - Venturi
 Twenty Years (1949)
 Se fossi deputato (1949) - Armando Proietti
 I peggiori anni della nostra vita (1950) - Flavio
 Ring Around the Clock (1950) - Parboni
 Women and Brigands (1950) - Beato
 Sambo (1950) - Romolo Cicerchia
 Rome-Paris-Rome (1951) - Riccardo
 Una bruna indiavolata! (1951) - Autista taxi
 Trieste mia! (1951)
 Hello Elephant (1952) - Signor Venturi, landlord
 Stranger on the Prowl (1952)
 Beauties in Capri (1952) - Don Violante
 At Sword's Edge (1952) - Bruno
 Five Paupers in an Automobile (152) - Battista
 Terminal Station (1953) - Railroad worker (uncredited)
 The Enchanting Enemy (1953)
 Too Young for Love (1953) - Commisario
 One of Those (1953) - Italo
 Buon viaggio pover'uomo (1953) - Saletti
 Ivan, Son of the White Devil (1953) - Boris
 Scampolo 53 (1953)
 Lasciateci in pace (1953)
 Two Nights with Cleopatra (1954) - Legionario
 A Slice of Life (1954) - Tassista (segment "Il pupo")
 Papà Pacifico (1954) - Augusto Ceccacci
 The Steel Rope (1954) - Checco
 Prima di sera (1954) - Antoni - the police commissioner
 La bella Otero (1954)
 The Art of Getting Along (1954) - (uncredited)
 Le signorine dello 04 (1955) - Angry Client
 The Last Five Minutes (1955) - Il portiere
 Destination Piovarolo (1955) - Il sacrestano
 Racconti romani (1955) - Annibale
 Cortile (1955) - Amedeo
 Tragic Ballad (1955) - Commisario
 La banda degli onesti (1956) - Maresciallo Denti (uncredited)
 L'intrusa (1956) - Carabinieres' Marshal
 I giorni più belli (1956)
 Due sosia in allegria (1956)
 Donne amori e matrimoni (1956) - Il maresciallo
 Parola di ladro (1957) - Guardiano notturno
 La ragazza del Palio (1957) - The Car Mechanic
 Primo applausio (1957)
 Fortunella (1958) - The American
 Ladro lui, ladra lei (1958) - Maresciallo Clemente
 È arrivata la parigina (1958) - Carlo
 The Love Specialist (1958) - Concierge
 Three Strangers in Rome (1958) - Vincenzo, Sergio's father
 Mogli pericolose (1958) - The Taxi Driver
 Sorrisi e canzoni (1958) - Capo muratore
 Everyone's in Love (1959) - Cesare
 I Tartassati (1959) - L'ubriaco
 Piove (1959) - Il commendatore Filippo Proietti
 La cento chilometri (1959) - Nando
 Il vedovo (1959) - Zio Armando
 Gastone (1960) - Michele
 Il Mattatore (1960) - Owner of big restaurant
 The Traffic Policeman (1960) - cognato di Otello
 Madri pericolose (1960) - Paolo Rossi
 Ravishing (1960) - Official at Rome Airport
 Time Out for Love (1961) - Buccieri
 Sua Eccellenza si fermò a mangiare (1961) - The Innkeeper
 The Joy of Living (1961) - Maresciallo
 Totò di notte n. 1 (1962)

References

External links

1895 births
1963 deaths
Italian male film actors
Nastro d'Argento winners
20th-century Italian male actors